Jay Don Blake (born October 28, 1958) is an American professional golfer who has played on the PGA Tour and the Nationwide Tour. He currently plays on the PGA Tour Champions.

Blake was born and raised in St. George, Utah, where he attended Dixie High School, graduating in 1977. Blake learned the game of golf on the public Dixie Red Hills Golf Course. He attended Utah State University in Logan and was a member of the golf team. He won the 1980 NCAA Championship and was named NCAA Player of the Year in 1981. He turned pro in 1981 and joined the PGA Tour in 1987.

Although Blake has only one victory on the PGA Tour, he earned a spot in the top-125 for 15 consecutive years after joining the tour in 1987. Blake has more than 3 dozen top-10 finishes in official PGA Tour events, including more than a half-dozen seconds and thirds. Blake's best career year was 1991 when he had six top-10 finishes, including one Tour win, $563,854 in earnings and finished 21st on the final money list; he also had a win in international competition that year. His best finish in a major championship is T6 at the 1992 U.S. Open.

In his late 40s, Blake played mostly in Nationwide Tour events. He began playing on the Champions Tour in 2009. He earned his first win in September 2011 at the Songdo IBD Championship in South Korea then picked up his second victory of the year at the season ending Charles Schwab Cup Championship.

Blake lives in St. George, Utah.

Amateur wins (1)
1980 NCAA Division I Championship (individual medalist)

Professional wins (7)

PGA Tour wins (1)

Other wins (3)
1988 Utah Open
1991 Argentine Open
1994 Jerry Ford Invitational

Champions Tour wins (3)

Champions Tour playoff record (2–1)

Playoff record
Japan Golf Tour playoff record (0–1)

Results in major championships

CUT = missed the half-way cut
WD = withdrew
"T" = tied

Summary

Most consecutive cuts made – 4 (1992 U.S. Open - 1993 U.S. Open)
Longest streak of top-10s – 1

Results in senior major championships
Results not in chronological order prior to 2021.

CUT = missed the halfway cut
"T" indicates a tie for a place
NT = No tournament due to COVID-19 pandemic

See also
1986 PGA Tour Qualifying School graduates

References

External links

American male golfers
PGA Tour golfers
PGA Tour Champions golfers
Golfers from Utah
Utah State University alumni
People from St. George, Utah
1958 births
Living people